Ladislav Ferebauer (born 25 October 1957) is a Czech former cyclist. He competed in the individual road race event at the 1980 Summer Olympics.

References

External links
 

1957 births
Living people
Czech male cyclists
Olympic cyclists of Czechoslovakia
Cyclists at the 1980 Summer Olympics
Sportspeople from České Budějovice